Billy Dawson Koumetio (born 14 November 2002) is a French professional footballer who plays as a centre-back for Premier League club Liverpool.

Club career 
Koumetio moved to Liverpool's Academy from French side US Orléans in November 2018. Koumetio was originally on the books of his hometown club Olympique Lyonnais where he was predominantly a winger at first. His height led to coaching staff turning him into a centre-back when he was 14. Koumetio signed his first professional contract with Liverpool in August 2020, when aged 17 and already 6 ft 3".

He was a ball boy at Anfield for the 4-0 semi-final second leg victory over FC Barcelona in the 2018–19 UEFA Champions League in May 2019. In October 2019 he was named on the bench at the age of 16 for the Carabao Cup tie against Arsenal FC at Anfield. Manager Jürgen Klopp was quoted as using the nickname 
"Billy the kid! He doesn’t look like a kid. In my opinion, his face looks like a kid but then all the rest is like ‘Wow!’

Koumetio featured for Liverpool during the pre-season of the 2020-21 football season in friendly matches in Austria against Red Bull Salzburg and VfB Stuttgart. Koumetio made his first-ever appearance for the Reds’ first team on 9 December 2020 substituting in for Fabinho at the heart of defence in the UEFA Champions League  against FC Midtjylland. In doing so, he became the youngest player to feature for Liverpool in the Champions League, a record that was later broken by Stefan Bajcetic in 2022.

On 23 June 2022, Koumetio signed for Austrian Bundesliga side Austria Wien on a season-long loan. He was recalled on 10 January 2023.

International career
Born in France, Koumetio is of Cameroonian descent. He is a youth international for France at the Under-18  level.

Career statistics

Honours
Liverpool FC
FA Community Shield runner-up: 2020

References

External links

FFF Profile

2002 births
Living people
French footballers
France youth international footballers
French sportspeople of Cameroonian descent
Association football defenders
US Orléans players
Olympique Lyonnais players
Liverpool F.C. players
FK Austria Wien players
Premier League players
Austrian Football Bundesliga players
French expatriate footballers
French expatriates in England
French expatriates in Austria
Expatriate footballers in England
Expatriate footballers in Austria
Footballers from Lyon
Black French sportspeople